Danilia insperata is a species of sea snail, a marine gastropod mollusc, in the family Chilodontidae.

Distribution
This marine species is endemic to New Zealand.

References

 Powell A. W. B., New Zealand Mollusca, William Collins Publishers Ltd, Auckland, New Zealand 1979 
 Vilvens C. & Héros V. 2005. New species and new records of Danilia (Gastropoda: Chilodontidae) from the Western Pacific. Novapex 6(3) : 53-64

insperata)
Gastropods of New Zealand
Gastropods described in 1974